Kutai is a Malayic language spoken by 300,000 to 500,000 people. It is the native language of the Kutai people (Kutai: Urang Kutai), the indigenous ethnic group which lives along the Mahakam River in Borneo, especially in North Kalimantan, Indonesia. They are the principal population in the regencies of West Kutai, Kutai Kartanegara, and East Kutai within North Kalimantan province.

Kutai is part of the local Bornean Malayic languages and is closely related to but distinct from the Banjar language in South Kalimantan, Berau, also spoken in North Kalimantan and to some extent Brunei-Kedayan Malay as well. Kutai forms a dialect continuum between the two varieties and all three share similar phonology and vocabulary with each other.

Literature 
Kutai for most of its history is mainly a spoken language and is mostly used as a form of poetry (pantun). During the period of the Kutai Kartanegara Sultanate, most literature was written in Standard Malay in Jawi script instead of Kutai Malay.

Dialects  
Kutai, as with many Malay varieties on the island, is a dialect continuum. A dialect continuum or dialect chain is a spread of language varieties spoken across some geographical area such that neighbouring varieties differ only slightly, but the differences accumulate over distance so that widely separated varieties are not mutually intelligible. There are three principal dialects of Kutai Malay language; all three have little mutual intelligibility with each other due to the geographical proximity of these dialects. The three main dialects are Tenggarong, Kota Bangun, and Ancalong Estuary.

References

Languages of Indonesia
Agglutinative languages
Malay dialects

Malayic languages